Siinä näkijä missä tekijä is a 1972 novel by Finnish author Hannu Salama. It won the Nordic Council's Literature Prize in 1975.

References

1972 novels
20th-century Finnish novels
Finnish-language novels
Nordic Council's Literature Prize-winning works